The Željeznica is a river in Bar municipality of Montenegro. In Šušanj it flows into Adriatic sea. It is a perennial river which has tributaries from mountains Small Rumija and Sutorman. When Montenegrin army captured Bar from the Ottoman Empire in 1878 the Berlin Congress set the border between Austria-Hungary and Kingdom of Montenegro at the river Željeznica.

Gallery

Notes 

Rivers of Montenegro